Kathleen ("Kathy") Parker (born 1943) is a former Republican member of the Illinois Senate, who represented the 29th District from 1994 to 2003. The 29th district has a high percentage of independent voters and contains areas in Lake and Cook Counties.

Career

Parker, a co-owner of a manufacturers' representative firm, began her political career in 1975, winning election to the District 31 school board. She was then elected Northfield Township assessor, 1979–1983. Appointed to the Regional Transportation Authority in 1983, she served as its chairman beginning in 1986 until 1995 when she became a state legislator. President George H. Bush also appointed Parker to the U.S. Architectural and Transportation Barriers Compliance Board in 1991 and she served as its chairman from 1992 to 1995.

In 1994 Parker became the Republican candidate for the 29th state senatorial district, which now includes all or parts of Bannockburn, Deerfield, Des Plaines, Fort Sheridan, Glencoe, Glenview, Highland Park, Highwood, Knollwood, Lake Bluff, Lake Forest, Mount Prospect, Niles, Northbrook, Park Ridge, Prospect Heights and Riverwoods. She defeated incumbent Democrat Grace Mary Stern. Re-elected several times, she sponsored legislation concerning accessible day care and also rose to chair the Senate Transportation Committee as well as a Task Force on Mental Health issues. However, redistricting by Democratic legislators after the 2000 census, made Parker vulnerable to a Democratic opponent. In the 2002 election, Democrat Susan Garrett narrowly defeated Parker.

Personal background
Parker lives in Northbrook with her husband, Keith.  They have two adult sons. Parker received her bachelor's degree in mass communications from the University of Miami, Florida.

References

1943 births
Republican Party Illinois state senators
University of Miami School of Communication alumni
Living people
Politicians from Pittsburgh
People from Northbrook, Illinois
Women state legislators in Illinois
21st-century American politicians
21st-century American women politicians